Beinn a' Chrùlaiste is a mountain to the north of Glen Coe, in the Highlands of Scotland. The Mountain is rectangular, and can be seen from the A82 road and the Old Military Road (West Highland Way). Also, when passing the A82, it is possible to see the summit of Stob Dearg (Buachaille Etive Mòr). Beinn a' Chrulaiste stands at 857 m (2811 ft), making it a Corbett.

The width of Beinn a' Chrulaiste is about three miles, and there is also a summit on the western side of the mountain called Stob Beinn a' Chrulaiste (639 m or 2096 ft).

See also
Glen Coe
Mountains and hills of Scotland
Buachaille Etive Mòr

External links
 WalkHighlands, a guide to Scotland's Highlands

Corbetts
Marilyns of Scotland
Mountains and hills of the Central Highlands
Climbing areas of Scotland
Mountains and hills of Highland (council area)
Glen Coe